The Division One League, currently known as the Access Bank Division One League for sponsorship reasons, is the second tier football league in Ghana organized by the Ghana Football Association. The winner of each of the three zones will be promoted to the Ghana Premier League.

League structure
The league is divided into three zones with a zone in the southern, middle and northern sectors of the country. 

Regions Zone One: Brong-Ahafo, Northern, Upper West & Upper East Region

Regions Zone Two: Central, Western & Ashanti Region

Regions Zone Three: Eastern, Volta & Greater Accra Region

2020-21 

Division One League clubs with a stadium capacity of at least 10,000:

2021-22

See also 

 Ghana Premier League

 List of football clubs in Ghana
 Ghana Football Leagues

References 

Football leagues in Ghana